CABI (legally CAB International, formerly Commonwealth Agricultural Bureaux) is a nonprofit intergovernmental development and information organisation focusing primarily on agricultural and environmental issues in the developing world, and the creation, curation, and dissemination of scientific knowledge.

Overview
CABI is an international not-for-profit organisation. Their work is delivered through teams of CABI scientists and key partners working in over 40 countries across the world. CABI states its mission as "improving people’s lives worldwide by solving problems in agriculture and the environment". These problems include loss of crops caused by pests and diseases, invasive weeds and pests that damage farm production and biodiversity, and lack of global access to scientific research.

Funding
CABI states that only 3% of its revenue comes from core funding.

Donors listed in the company's 2014 financial report include the UK's Department for International Development (£4,962k), the Swiss Agency for Development and Cooperation (CHF 972k), the European Union (€3,242k) and the International Fund for Agricultural Development (US$570k). A not-insignificant portion of CABI's revenue is made up of member country contributions.

Projects
CABI engages in a variety of projects that address agricultural and environmental issues worldwide. Typically these focus on commodity crops, invasive species, and scientific communication.

Invasive Species

CABI hosts a large number of invasive species-related projects that it is currently planning to bring under one banner. Many of these projects don't focus on a particular area, but on specific species. Notable projects include research into invasive plants including Japanese Knotweed, Giant Hogweed and Himalayan Balsam.

Plantwise
Plantwise is a global programme with the purpose of reducing crop losses and improving food security by collecting and sharing information about plant health. Plantwise is supported by an alliance of international partners, who typically provide content or funding. In 2017, the project won US$100,000 from the St Andrews Prize for the Environment.

BioProtection Portal
CABI BioProtection Portal is a global resource for natural, non-toxic biocontrol and biopesticide products. Users can search for a crop or pest to discover the solutions available in a particular country. The initiative was developed to help farmers and growers to use less chemical pesticides.

Microbial services
CABI housed a collection of over 28,000 fungi samples from around the world to carry out microbial identification, preservations, patenting, training and consultancy from their offices and labs in Egham, England. In 2009, these were merged with the collection at the Royal Botanic Gardens, Kew. This move was supported by a £250,000 grant from the UK government.

Notable people
Professor Ruth Oniang'o who is a leading nutritionist from Kenya sits on the board (in 2020).

Publishing

The publishing division of CABI helps to fund the scientific research and projects undertaken by the other two divisions. CABI publishes books, abstract databases (such as CAB Direct) and online resources. Subject areas include agriculture, plant sciences, veterinary sciences, environmental science, food, nutrition, and tourism.

CABI's database 'Global Health' is a specialist bibliographic, abstracting and indexing database dedicated to public health research and practice. Publications from over 158 countries in 50 languages are abstracted and all relevant non-English-language papers are translated to give access to research not available through any other database. In 2010, CABI became an official supporting organisation of Healthcare Information For All by 2015 as part of its support to improve availability and use of healthcare information in low-income countries.

References

External links 
  of the Centre for Agriculture and Bioscience International

Non-profit organisations based in the United Kingdom
Environmental organisations based in the United Kingdom
Bibliographic database providers
Agricultural organisations based in the United Kingdom
Organisations based in Oxfordshire
1910 establishments in England